The constituency Grevenmacher elected members to Luxembourg's national legislature, the Chamber of Deputies, from 1848 until its abolition in 1919.  It was coterminous with the canton of Grevenmacher, in the east of the country.

After its abolition, it was replaced by Est, which covered the whole of the District of Grevenmacher, which also included the cantons of Echternach and Remich.

Members elected to represent Grevenmacher include François Altwies (1911–19), Joseph Bech (1914–19), and Auguste Metz (1848–54).

Chamber of Deputies of Luxembourg constituency
Defunct Chamber of Deputies of Luxembourg constituencies
History of Luxembourg (1815–1890)
History of Luxembourg (1890–1945)
1848 establishments in Luxembourg
1919 disestablishments in Luxembourg
Constituencies established in 1848
Constituencies disestablished in 1919